The House of Bourbon-Two Sicilies is a cadet branch of the Spanish Bourbons that ruled Southern Italy and Sicily for more than a century in the 18th and 19th centuries. It descends from the Capetian dynasty in legitimate male line through Philippe de Bourbon, Duke of Anjou, a younger grandson of Louis XIV of France (1638–1715) who established the Bourbon dynasty in Spain in 1700 as Philip V (1683–1746). In 1759 King Philip's younger grandson was appanaged with the kingdoms of Naples and Sicily, becoming Ferdinand IV and III (1751–1825), respectively, of those realms. His descendants occupied the joint throne (renamed "Kingdom of the Two Sicilies" in 1816) until 1861, claimed it thereafter from exile, and constitute the extant Bourbon-Two Sicilies family.

The succession of the House of Bourbon-Two Sicilies has, since 1960, been disputed between the senior Calabrian line, which is currently being represented by Prince Pedro, Duke of Calabria (born 1968) and the junior Castro line, which is currently being represented by Prince Carlo, Duke of Castro (born 1963). Since Prince Carlo, Duke of Castro, has only daughters, in accordance with the traditional male-line succession of the House of Bourbon-Two Sicilies, the succession in theory should go to the senior Calabrian line since Prince Pedro, Duke of Calabria has male heirs. Efforts of reconciliation were carried out in 2014, but have been followed by continuing arguing within the family as Prince Carlo, Duke of Castro, insists on a break with tradition by transmitting succession to his eldest daughter.

Name
The name "Bourbon-Two Sicilies" (sometimes shortened to "Bourbon-Sicily") combines the patriline (Bourbon) with their former territorial designation (Two Sicilies).

Kingdom of the Two Sicilies

The first Kingdom of the Two Sicilies resulted from the unification of the Kingdom of Sicily with the Kingdom of Naples (called the kingdom of peninsular Sicily), by King Alfonso V of Aragon in 1442. The two had been separated since the Sicilian Vespers of 1282. At the death of King Alfonso in 1458, the kingdom became divided between his brother John II of Aragon, who kept Sicily, and his bastard son Ferdinand, who became king of Naples.

Reigning kings

|-
| Ferdinand I1816–1825 ||  || 12 January 1751Naplesson of Charles VII and Maria Amalia of Saxony||Marie Caroline of Austria12 May 176817 childrenLucia Migliaccio of Floridia27 November 1814No children||4 January 1825Naplesaged 73
|-
| Francis I1825–1830||  || 14 August 1777Naplesson of Ferdinand I and Maria Carolina of Austria||Maria Isabella of Spain6 July 180212 children||8 November 1830Naplesaged 53
|-
| Ferdinand II1830–1859 ||  || 12 January 1810Palermoson of Francis I and Maria Isabella of Spain||Maria Christina of Savoy21 November 18321 childMaria Theresa of Austria9 January 183712 children||22 May 1859Casertaaged 49
|-
| Francis II1859–1861||  || 16 January 1836Naplesson of Ferdinand II and Maria Christina of Savoy||Maria Sophie of Bavaria8 January 18591 child||27 December 1894Arcoaged 58
|-
|}
In 1861 Two Sicilies became part of the newly founded Kingdom of Italy.

Heads of the House since 1861

When Prince Ferdinand Pius died in 1960, he left no male descendant, and two branches of the family claimed the right to succeed him as head of the house. Ferdinand Pius had seven younger brothers. At the time of Ferdinand Pius's death in 1960, the oldest brother, Carlos (1870–1949) was deceased, but had left descendants. The next surviving brother was Ranieri (1883–1973). By the rule of primogeniture, headship would normally pass through Carlos to his son Alfonso. Ranieri contested Alfonso's claim arguing that Carlos had renounced any claim to the Two Sicilies succession on the part of himself and his heirs when he executed the Act of Cannes in 1900 in anticipation of his marriage the next year to Mercedes, Princess of Asturias, heiress presumptive to the Spanish throne. Alfonso offered a different interpretation of the Act of Cannes, describing it as effective only if Carlos should succeed to the Spanish throne. He also took the position that the Act of Cannes was invalid under the succession rules of the house of Two Sicilies itself. The dispute remains unresolved.

On 25 January 2014, representatives of the two rival branches, Prince Carlo (Castro line) and Prince Pedro, then Duke of Noto (Calabria line), jointly signed a pledge of partial reconciliation. The document recognised both branches as members of the same house, committed both to pursue further reconciliation and concord, meanwhile recognising the titles then claimed by each branch.

At the Holy Mass in Saint Peter's Basilica celebrated in Rome on 14 May 2016, during the International Pilgrimage of the Sacred Military Constantinian Order of Saint George to Rome and Vatican City, Prince Carlo made public his decision to change the rules of succession. This change was made in order to make the rules of succession compatible with international and European law, prohibiting any discrimination between men and women. The rule of absolute primogeniture would henceforth apply to his direct descendants, his elder daughter being recognized as heiress apparent. Prince Pedro publicly objected that Prince Carlo's declaration violated the terms of their reconciliation agreement, to which Carlo replied that further "destabilisation" could lead to termination of the 2014 pact.

Members of the House

Titles

Children and male-line grandchildren of the King of the Two Sicilies bore the title Prince(ss) Royal of the Two Sicilies with the style of Royal Highness. Other agnatic descendants of the King, born of authorized marriages, bore the title Prince(ss) of the Two Sicilies with the style of Royal Highness.

Since 1861, and similarly to members of the House of Bourbon-Parma, the style Prince(ss) of Bourbon-Two Sicilies has been used for and by members of this family to highlight their membership in the House of Bourbon. The title of princess is also born by the wives of the princes of the house provided the marriage is dynastically approved.

Princes of the Two Sicilies (since 1816)

Princesses of the Two Sicilies (since 1816)

By birth

By marriage

See also

List of monarchs of the Kingdom of the Two Sicilies
List of royal consorts of the Kingdom of the Two Sicilies
Descendants of Louis XIV

References

External links
Royal House Of Bourbon Two Sicilies - official website of the Neapolitan branch of the House of Bourbon-Two Sicilies
Real Casa Borbone Due Sicilie - official website of the Spanish branch of the House of Bourbon-Two Sicilies
Associazione per i Siti Reali e le Residenze Borboniche

 
1759 establishments in Italy